Jacques-Léonard Pérocheau, M.E.P. (1787–1861) was a Roman Catholic prelate who served as Vicar Apostolic of Northwestern Szechwan (1856–1861), Vicar Apostolic of Se-Ciuen (1838–1856), and Titular Bishop of Maxula Prates (1817–1861).

Biography
Jacques-Léonard Pérocheau was born in Les Sables-d'Olonne, France on 6 Jan 1787 and ordained a priest in the La Société des Missions Etrangères in 1812.
On 3 Oct 1817, he was appointed during the papacy of Pope Pius VII as Titular Bishop of Maxula Prates and Coadjutor Vicar Apostolic of Se-Ciuen.
On 1 Feb 1818, he was consecrated bishop by François de Bovet, Archbishop of Toulouse, with Jean-Claude Leblanc de Beaulieu, Archbishop of Arles, and William Poynter, Titular Bishop of Alias, serving as co-consecrators. 
On 11 Jul 1838, he succeeded to the bishopric. 
On 4 Apr 1856, he was appointed during the papacy of Pope Pius IX as Vicar Apostolic of Northwestern Szechwan.
He served as Vicar Apostolic of Northwestern Szechwan until his death on 6 May 1861.

Episcopal succession
While bishop, he was the principal consecrator of:
Giacomo Luigi Fontana, Titular Bishop of Sinitis and Vicar Apostolic of Se-Ciuen (1820);
Joseph Ponsot, Titular Bishop of Philomelium and Vicar Apostolic of Yünnan (1843);
Eugène-Jean-Claude-Joseph Desflèches, Titular Bishop of Sinitis and Coadjutor Vicar Apostolic of Se-Ciuen (1844); and
Annet-Théophile Pinchon, Titular Bishop of Polemonium and Coadjutor Vicar Apostolic of Northwestern Szechwan (1859).

See also 
 Catholic Church in Sichuan

References 

19th-century Roman Catholic bishops in China
Bishops appointed by Pope Pius VII
Bishops appointed by Pope Pius IX
1787 births
1861 deaths
Paris Foreign Missions Society bishops
Roman Catholic missionaries in Sichuan
People from Les Sables-d'Olonne